Toby Victor Mott (born 12 January 1964) is a British artist, designer, and sometime Punk historian known for his work with the Grey Organisation, an artists' collective that was active in the 1980s, and for his fashion brand Toby Pimlico. More recently he has become known for his Mott Collection, an archive of UK punk rock and political ephemera that includes over 1,000 posters, flyers, and fanzines.

Early life
Toby Mott was born in London, son of academic Jim Mott and social worker Pam. He received a scholarship to attend the progressive, independent St. Mary's Town and Country School. At some point, the scholarship was withdrawn, and he went on to complete his schooling at Pimlico Comprehensive, where he shared a classroom with the screenwriter Amy Jenkins and Patrick Harrington, an infamous leading member of the National Front.

He later studied art at Westminster Kingsway College where Sid Vicious of the Sex Pistols was an alumnus. Mott was a founder member of the ASA (Anarchist Street Army, a late 1970s organisation that caused disturbances in the Pimlico area of London).

In the early 1980s he lived at the Carburton Street squats in Fitzrovia, a centre of artistic activity at the time – other residents included Boy George, Marilyn, Cerith Wyn Evans, Fiona Russell-Powell, and Mark Lebon. During this period Mott appeared in a number of films made by the British director Derek Jarman, notably The Angelic Conversation and also appearing in Gilbert & George's "Exister" pieces from 1984, currently in the Tate Collection.

In the late 1980s and early 1990s he was based in New York and Los Angeles working part-time as a bicycle messenger and as an art director for MTV making music videos for various groups, among them Public Enemy, A Tribe called Quest and The Rolling Stones. In 1989 Mott designed album cover graphics for groups such as Information Society and De La Soul, most notably their debut album 3 Feet High and Rising

Anarchist Street Army
The Anarchist Street Army (ASA) was a loose collective of young punks and anarchists from several inner city London Schools including Pimlico Comprehensive, London Nautical School, and Camden School for Girls, who congregated around an independent record shop on Wilton Road called Recordsville and attended Crass concerts.
Their motives as an organisation were varied, but had a general ethos of bringing anarchy and chaos to the London streets, such as crashing Capital Radio's Nicky Horne show in an attempt to save the Roxy, and were a forerunner to later organisations with similar attitudes such as Class War, The Wombles, and protest tactics like Black Bloc.
The ASA's motto and anthem was 'Running Riot' a punk rock song by the band Cock Sparrer, later adopted by Right Wing factions within the Oi! movement.

Solo art career

Mott was a co-founder of the East London art group the Grey Organisation (GO) who were active from 1983 to 1991. GO worked in several mediums including film and video and participated in over 20 international exhibitions. In January 1985 the group committed an act of "art terrorism" by smuggling one of their paintings into the International Contemporary Arts Fair in London. The following year they mounted an attack on Cork Street, then the centre of the London art world, splashing grey paint on the windows of a number of galleries. After this, members of the group were arrested and for a time banned from central London. This resulted in them relocating to New York City where they exhibited at The Civilian Warfare Gallery in the East Village. When GO disbanded in 1991, Mott pursued a solo career exhibiting at White Columns NYC, The Thomas Soloman Garage, Los Angeles and Interim Art, London. He was for many years represented by the Maureen Paley gallery.

In September 2011 Toby Mott produced a series of paintings inspired by the 2011 England riots, the resulting exhibition 'Unrest' was exhibited at Vegas Gallery, London. Many of the paintings in the exhibition were brandished with the slogan 'All Coppers Are Bastards' in gold leaf a reference to the legendary punk/political slogan.

Mott said of this exhibition "I was going to call the exhibition, 'I’ll keep looting until I get caught'— a quote from a looter but which could equally apply to a banker, [T]hose at the bottom are taking their lead from those at the top; although the rioters act in a cruder way, it is essentially the same thing."

In October 2011, Knightsbridge gallery New Contemporary presented a solo exhibition of paintings by Mott entitled 'This Means Everything'. "The show is  collection of new paintings addressing our culture's present preoccupation with fame and success versus the historical background of nihilism and anarchy as epitomised by the punk movement."

In 2013, Toby Mott exhibited a print edition of the original album art work for De La Soul's 3 Feet High and Rising, displayed alongside memorabilia such as Mott's original sketch, his gold disc, and other items from his private collection. Mott wrote an essay meant to accompany the exhibition in which he described the creation of the 1989 album art. He was commissioned to design the album cover by Tommy Boy Records and invited the De La Soul trio to his New York loft. Atop a stepladder, he took the now-iconic black and white photograph of the three and added the dayglo "daisy-age" art in post-production.

The Mott Collection

Mott began his collection in the late 1970s. In addition to the iconic works of the era, notably those produced by Jamie Reid for The Sex Pistols and Linder Sterling for the Buzzcocks, it includes propaganda from political groups such as Rock Against Racism and the British National Front and memorabilia from the Silver Jubilee of Elizabeth II, an event that collided with punk's high-water mark in 1977. Esopus released material from the Mott Collection related to Margaret Thatcher in 2013. The special edition publication came with several facsimile reproductions of archival materials and a removable insert that commemorated Thatcher's polarizing tenure.

Exhibitions and books from the Mott Collection include:

 Loud Flash: British Punk on Paper, MUSAC, Museo de Arte Contemporáneo de Castilla y León, March 2010 accompanied by the publication, Loud Flash: British Punk on Paper  a selection of posters and essays designed by cult designer Scott King.
 Loud Flash: British Punk on Paper, Haunch of Venison, London, 2010 accompanied by the publication, Loud Flash: British Punk on Paper  produced by Haunch of Venison. On the occasion of the exhibition at Haunch of Venison a Panel discussion took place on the subject of the enduring legacy of Punk, Moderated by Mark Ingelfield, Gallery Director, panel members: Tony D, editor of Ripped and Torn fanzine, Ray Gange, star of The Clash film Rude Boy, Toby Mott, artist, writer and collector; Teal Triggs, author of the Thames & Hudson book Fanzines, Peter York, style writer and author of The Official Sloane Ranger Handbook.
 Crass, Andrew Roth Gallery, New York, February 2011, accompanied by the publication: Crass 1977 – 1984, PPP Editions, 2011
 Loud Flash: British Punk on Paper, Honor Fraser, Los Angeles, July 2011 accompanied by the publication: Loud Flash: British Punk on Paper at Honor Fraser, designed by Brian Roettinger.
On the occasion of the exhibition at Honor Fraser a panel discussion took place moderated by Professor Vivien Goldman of the NYU Tisch School of the Arts, panel members: Gardar Eide Einarsson, Artist, Billy Idol, Punk Musician, Toby Mott, artist, writer and collector, Simon Reynolds, British author and music journalist.
 We Have Our Own Concept of Time and Motion, Auto Italia South East, London, 25–28 Aug
 Nothing in the World But Youth, Selections from the Mott Collection: Thatcher's youth, Turner Contemporary, Margate, 17 September 2011 – 8 January 2012 accompanied by the publication: Nothing in the World But Youth, 
 We Are the Writing on the Wall, MoMA PS1: NY Art Book Fair, New York City, 30 September – 2 October accompanied by the publication: 100 Fanzines/10 Years of British Punk – 1976–1985, PPP Editions  On the occasion of the exhibition at MoMA PS1 a panel discussion took place on the history of British punk fanzines, moderated by Professor Vivien Goldman of the NYU Tisch School of the Arts, Toby Mott, artist, writer and collector, Joly MacFie, fanzine publisher, Victor Brand writer, Michael Gonzales afro-punk music writer.
 Jubilee 2012 – Sixty Punk Singles, The Vinyl Factory, London, 30 May – 24 June 2012.
Accompanied by the exhibition catalogue: Jubilee 2012 – Sixty Punk Singles, designed and printed by Ditto Press, 

 KRAFTWERK. 45RPM, The Vinyl Factory, London, 13 Sep – 5 October 2012.
An exhibition of forty-five 7" single covers by the German krautrock group Kraftwerk, many designed by Emil Schult.
Accompanied by the exhibition catalogue KRAFTWERK. 45RPM, designed and printed by Ditto Press, 
In the catalogue's introductory essay 'Kraftwerk, Yesterday's Tomorrow', Mott describes the group's aesthetic as "an analogue past dreaming of today's digital present."
 David Bowie – Nacht Musik, The Vinyl Factory, London, 7 Feb – 3 March 2013.
An exhibition of forty-five 7" single covers by David Bowie, from his Berlin period.
Accompanied by the exhibition catalogue David Bowie – Nacht Musik, designed and printed by Ditto Press
 American Hardcore 1978 – 1990, Vinyl Factory, London, 11 April – 4 May 2013.
An exhibition of fifty 7" single covers by various American Hardcore Punk bands such as Black Flag, JFA, Bad Brains, & The Dicks among others.
Accompanied by the exhibition catalogue American Hardcore 1978 – 1990, designed and printed by Ditto Press, 
 SKINHEAD - AN ARCHIVE, published 2014 by Ditto and The Mott Collection
A publication exploring one of the most controversial and radical subcultures. with printed material curated by Mott, the book examines this multi-faceted culture through the filter of printed material, zines, posters and films. The book is divided into sub-sections looking at the original iteration of skinhead, the fascist interpretation, the socialist counterpoint, queer skinhead culture, exploitation literature, skin girls, and everything in between. 
 Showboat: Punk / Sex / Bodies (Dashwood Books - )-  Showboat is a collection published by Mott in 2016, exploring the relationship between punk and sex. Numerous people contributed to the book including Paul Cook of the Sex Pistols, Garry Bushell, filmmaker Nick Zedd, and artist Annie Sprinkle. In addition to photo galleries, the book has personal essays and lyrics from 1972 to 2016. The collection also contains never before exhibited images by Shirley Baker from the 1980s.
 Oh So Pretty: Punk in Print 1976-1980 (Phaidon Press - )- In late 2016 Mott published Punk in Print, a collection of flyers, ticket stubs, and other memorabilia showing the early days of punk. The New York Observer stated the book was, "collectively, the raw, abrasive look of the promotional material from the music scene back then packs a powerful punch, presented with the immediacy of youthful creativity in an instinctive way." The book was originally published in 2015 as Punk in Print 1976-1980.

CRASS exhibition
In February 2011 Mott exhibited another part of his collection, 'Crass, selections from The Mott Collection', an exhibition of objects and artefacts centred on the anarchic, post-punk culture of the British band Crass, at the Roth gallery, New York. The exhibition featured artwork, albums and ephemera, including original 12" LPs and EPs, 7" singles from Crass Records, and a complete set of Crass' iconic house zine, Inter-National Anthem. The material featured in the exhibition spanned the high period of Crass' endeavours, from 1978 to 1984, and constituted a special segment of The Mott Collection.

Jubilee exhibition
To celebrate the Diamond Jubilee of Queen Elizabeth II, the Mott Collection exhibited a collection of sixty 7" punk singles including records by The Clash, Ian Dury, The Cortinas, and the Buzzcocks among others. The exhibition was accompanied by a publication of the same name reproducing various group's cover artwork including the iconic "God Save the Queen" by the Sex Pistols.
In an interview with Peter Aspden in the Financial Times, Mott discusses how the Queen became an icon of the punk movement after the Sex Pistols defaced Cecil Beaton's portrait of her with a safety-pin.

"I was playing some of the records yesterday," said Mott. "They are amazing. They are so musical. They are like pop. I can't believe my parents said they were nothing but noise. Really, it is something you would want your own kids to be doing, it was so creative, instead of all this consumer stuff and video games. Punk was portrayed as this negative thing but, in fact, it was a high point and a lasting part of British culture. And that is why we should be celebrating it. Punk marked the end of the postwar period. It gave birth to individualism and then the Thatcher era that followed."

The book was designed by Ditto Press and printed on a Risograph machine.

Skinhead culture
In 2013, Mott curated an exhibition called "Where Have All The Bootboys Gone? Skinhead Style and Graphic Subculture." The exhibition was held at the London College of Communication. It was said to be an exploration of the Skinhead subculture, its ties to the punk movement and Oi!, and the aesthetics and politics therein. Mott was criticized for opening the exhibit during Black History Month, but he defended his position saying, "I don't understand the objection. I thought everyone loves skinheads. They are as British as chicken korma."

In March 2014, Mott participated in London's Jewish Book Week. He spoke on a panel on the Jewish roots of punk alongside Geoff Travis, Daniel Miller, Charles Shaar Murray, and Vivien Goldman.

Cultural Traffic

Mott launched a counter culture book fair called Cultural Traffic. It launched at Truman's Brewery in Shoreditch in 2016. The fair showcases affordable art that is engaged in current social and political issues. The debut collection showcased works from contributors such as Angel Rose, Skin Deep, William Ling Fine Art, and The Photocopy Club.

Toby Pimlico
Toby Pimlico is a fashion label based on paintings by Toby Mott. Mott began making paintings based on detention school 'lines' such as "I Will Try Harder"; these were then transferred onto T-shirts, transforming them into a recognisable design motif. He came up with the brand name, Toby Pimlico, and an initial six designs, including "I Must Not Chase the Boys" and "I Have Nothing To Wear".
The T-shirts began to have a cult following after being worn by Kate Moss, the actress Sienna Miller, Geri Halliwell from The Spice Girls and It Girl Tara Palmer-Tomkinson. The label also received praise from the Prince of Wales.

Other slogans are used to promote social consciousness, such as the Marie Curie-inspired 'love you to death.'

The label was launched at London Fashion Week in 1998.

The Brand now includes a range of tea towels, maternity wear and knickers.

Mott responded to his own success and transition from Punk to artist-businessman by calling himself a 'Gold Card Anarchist'

In 2014, Mott launched the website TobyShop.com as a way to promote the brand. He released a line of vintage slogan T-shirts for the Toby Shop. The design is similar to T-shirts he first created in 1999, but with a modern twist. The line of shirts features slogans like "Show Me The Moet" and "Saturday Girl."

Personal life
Mott divorced celebrity hairdresser Louise Galvin in 2008 after one year of marriage, as reported in the Evening Standard. Mott met Galvin through a mutual friend, she was already several months pregnant when they married. "The marriage was never going to work, I discovered Louise had matching Louis Vuitton luggage" says Mott.

Their daughter was born in 2007.

References

External links

 Interview with Toby Mott in Isis magazine
 Painting by Toby Mott in the Chelsea and Westminster Health Charity art collection
 Creative Review on KRAFTWERK 45
 Financial Times on Jubilee – Sixty Punk Singles
 Interview with Toby Mott on Talking About My Generation
 Interview with Toby Mott at D&AD
 Panel discussion: 100 Fanzines/10 Years of British Punk: 1976–1985
 Toby Mott talks about Jeremy Paxman's underwear
 Punk on Paper panel discussion, Honor Fraser Gallery
 Haunch of Venison Panel Discussion video
 Huffington Post – The Punk Movement: 10 Years of British Punk Chronicled
 Andrew Roth Gallery
 Toby Mott in Gilbert & George's 'The Existers'   (In yellow suit, seated next to George)
 https://www.vice.com/en_uk/read/toby-mott-interview-skinhead-book-324
 https://www.independent.co.uk/life-style/fashion/features/the-cult-of-the-skinhead-where-are-the-buzz-cuts-now-9913703.html
 http://www.esopus.org/contents/view/316

1964 births
Artists from London
Bicycle messengers
Living people
20th-century squatters
Writers from London
People educated at St Mary's Town and Country School